This is the discography of South Korean rock band F.T. Island. They debuted in 2007 with Cheerful Sensibility.

Albums

Studio albums

Reissues

Compilation albums

Single albums

Extended plays

Singles

Soundtracks

Videography

Music videos

References

Discographies of South Korean artists
Rock music group discographies
Discography
K-pop music group discographies